Malthonea tigrinata is a species of beetle in the family Cerambycidae. It was described by Thomson in 1864. It is known from Argentina and Brazil.

References

Desmiphorini
Beetles described in 1864